The following lists events that happened during 1810 in Australia.

Incumbents
Monarch - George III

Governors
Governors of the Australian colonies:
Governor of New South Wales – Lachlan Macquarie
Lieutenant-Governor of Tasmania – David Collins

Events
1 January – Lachlan Macquarie sworn in as governor of New South Wales.
8 January – The Derwent Star and Van Diemen's Land Intelligencer, Australia's second newspaper and the first in Van Diemen's Land, begins publication.

Exploration and settlement
6 October – A town plan of Sydney was published, on which the streets were given new and permanent names, including Market, George, Park and Barrack Streets.

Births
 10 January – William Haines, 1st Premier of Victoria (born in the United Kingdom) (d. 1866)
 14 August – Angus McMillan, explorer, pastoralist, and Victorian politician (born in the United Kingdom) (d. 1865)

Deaths
 24 March – David Collins, Lieutenant-Governor of Tasmania (born in the United Kingdom) (b. 1756)
 Tedbury, Sydney indigenous leader

References

 
Australia
Years of the 19th century in Australia